Sabine Heinefetter, marital name Sabine Marquet (19 August 1809, in Mainz – 18 November 1872, in Achern) was a German operatic soprano.

Life 
After a stage training she sang for the first time 1824/25 in front of an audience in Frankfurt am Main. In 1826 she sang Pamina in The Magic Flute at the Staatstheater Mainz. She moved to Kassel where she was further taught by Louis Spohr. In Paris she sang alongside Maria Malibran and Franziska Sontag in the Opéra-Comique. In 1829 she returned to Germany. On guest tours she appeared successfully at the Vienna State Opera, 1832 at La Scala and since 1833 at the Königsstädtisches Theater in Berlin. She belonged to the latter for two years. In 1835 Heinefetter was engaged for half a year at the Morettisches Opernhaus.

Since 1842 the soprano lived retired in Baden, and married in Marseille in 1853.

Heinefetter died at age 63 during a stay in the  lunatic asylum. She had five sisters:

 Eva Heinfetter (ca 1810–unknown), Opera singer
 Fatime Heinefetter (unknown–after 1842), Opera singer
 Kathinka Heinefetter (1819–1858), Opera singer
 Klara Stöckl-Heinefetter (1816–1857), Opera singer
 Nanette Heinefetter (life data unknown), Opera singer

as well as a brother, Johann Baptist Heinefetter (1815–1902), who became a painter.

Hommage 
In April 2016, the square in front of the Staatstheater Mainz was renamed "Geschwister-Heinefetter-Platz.

Further reading 
 Ludwig Eisenberg: Großes biographisches Lexikon der Deutschen Bühne im XIX. Jahrhundert. Verlag von Paul Liszt, Leipzig 1903, pp. 410 f.,.
 
 Heinefetter, Schwestern on Oesterreichisches Musiklexikon
 Salomon Wininger: Große Jüdische National-Biographie. Volume III, page 38.

References

External links 
 Heinefetter Sabine on Jewish Encyclopedia
 Sabine Heinefetter on Munich University
 Heinefetter Sabine on Operissimo

German operatic sopranos
1809 births
1872 deaths
Musicians from Mainz
19th-century German women opera singers
19th-century German Jews
Jewish opera singers